The Istanbul Metro is a rapid transit railway network that serves the city of Istanbul, Turkey. Apart from the M11 line, it is operated by Metro Istanbul, a public enterprise controlled by the Istanbul Metropolitan Municipality. The oldest section of the metro is the M1 line, which opened in 1989; the system now includes 133 stations in service, with 83 more under construction and 1 station reserved.

The system consists of eleven lines: the lines designated M1A, M1B, M2, M3, M6, M7, M9 and M11 are on the European side of the Bosporus, while lines M4, M5 and M8 are on the Asian side. Due to Istanbul's unique and difficult geography and the fact that the city is divided by the very deep Bosporus strait, the European and Asian metro networks do not connect directly. The two parts of the city are linked through the Marmaray commuter rail system, which is connected to the metro in several places. Three metro lines are under construction on the Asian side: M10 (Pendik Merkez-Fevzi Çakmak), M12 (60. Yıl Parkı-Kazım Karabekir) and the M14 (Altunizade-Kazım Karabekir). Additionaly, extension works on the M1B, M3, M7, M9 and M11 lines (on the European side) and the M4 and M5 lines (on the Asian side) are underway.

In addition to the Marmaray commuter rail, the metro connects to the F1, Tünel (F2) and F4 funicular lines and with the network of the Istanbul Tram.

History 

The oldest underground urban rail line in Istanbul is the Tünel, which entered service on 17 January 1875. It is the world's second-oldest underground urban rail line after the London Underground which was built in 1863, and the first underground urban rail line in continental Europe.

The first master plan for a full metro network in Istanbul, titled Avant Projet d'un Métropolitain à Constantinople and conceived by the French engineer L. Guerby, dates to 10 January 1912. The plan comprised a total of 24 stations between the Topkapı and Şişli districts and included a connection through the Golden Horn. The blueprints of the project, which was never realized, are today displayed at the Istanbul Technical University Museum.

In 1936 the French urban planner Henri Prost proposed a metro network between the districts of Taksim and Beyazıt, to the north and south of the Golden Horn, respectively. In October 1951 the Dutch firm Nedeco proposed a similar route between Taksim and Beyazıt, and in September 1952 the Director of the Paris Transportation Department, Marc Langevin, prepared a 14-chapter report together with his associate Louis Meizzonet for the implementation of the project and its integration with the other means of public transportation in the city. However, these plans never came into effect and all proposals were put on hold until 1987, when the planning for the current Istanbul Metro was made.

Construction works for the first 'modern' mass transit railway system started in 1989, with the first stations opening in September. İstanbul Ulaşım A.Ş. (now known as Metro Istanbul) was founded the previous year to operate the system. The M1 was initially called "Hafif Metro" (which literally translates as "light metro"). Although it was built as a fully grade separated line, the M1 line operates with shorter trainsets and shorter station platforms than is standard on a traditional metro line, hence its "light metro" designation. The M1 line was later extended from Aksaray towards the western suburbs, reaching Atatürk Airport in the southwest in 2002.

Construction of the M2 line began on 11 September 1992, but faced many challenges due to the numerous archaeological sites that were discovered during the drilling process, which slowed down or fully stopped the construction of many stations, especially in the south. Taking into account the seismic activity in Istanbul, the entire network was built with the cut-and-cover method to withstand an earthquake of up to 9.0 on the Richter magnitude scale.

The first section between Taksim and 4. Levent entered service, after some delays, on 16 September 2000. In 2000, there were 8 Alstom-built 4-car train sets in service, which ran every 5 minutes on average and transported 130,000 passengers daily. On 30 January 2009, the first train sets built by Eurotem entered service. Eurotem will build a total of 92 new wagons for the M2 line. As of 30 January 2009, a total of 34 trainsets, each with 4 cars, were being used on the M2 line. A northern extension from 4. Levent to Maslak was opened on 30 January 2009. On 2 September 2010, the northern (temporary) terminus Darüşşafaka followed. The southern extension of the M2 line from Taksim to Yenikapı, across the Golden Horn via Haliç station on the bridge and underground through the historic peninsula, entered service on 15 February 2014. The total cost of the extension was $593 million. At Yenikapı, it will intersect with the extended M1 line and the Marmaray commuter line, which since its opening in 2013 has offered a connection between the Asian and European sides of the city.

Levent (12 minutes), and 4. Levent - Haciosman (12 minutes.)

It cost €751 million and was built by the Astaldi / Makyol / Gülermak consortium. The first section opened on 17 August 2012, terminating in Kartal.

Operations

The Metro operates from 06:00 AM to 00.00 AM every 6–12 minutes. M2 Yenikapı - Hacıosman operates from 06:00 AM to 00.00 AM. During peak hours the intervals could be reduced to 3 to 4 minutes.

The metro has a flat fare of 9.90 TL. when used with the Istanbulkart, the city's universal contactless payment card. Discounts or free cards ar available to students, seniors and veterans.

Night operations

During August 2019 the Mayor of Istanbul, Ekrem İmamoğlu, announced that many lines of Istanbul were going to provide 24 hours service during weekends with trains at 20 minutes interval. Since August 2019, the Istanbul Metro started to provide 24 hours service for some lines at weekends and public holidays but this service was discontinued in March 2020 due to coronavirus pandemic. On March 5, 2022 Metro Istanbul announced that the night metro service would be re-started on the lines: M1A Yenikapi-Atatürk Airport, M1B Yenikapi-Kirazli, M2 Yenikapi-Haciosman, M4 Kadikoy-Sabiha Gökçen Airport, M5 Uskudar-Cekmekoy and M6 Levent-Bogazici University/Hisarustu, and later added M7 Mecidiyeköy-Mahmutbey on July 14, 2022.

Lines

Stations

The Istanbul Metro system has a total of 133 stations in operation with 83 more under construction. Since the majority of the system is underground, stations are generally accessed going down from street level. At every entrance to the metro is a post with the Istanbul metro "M" logo and the station name underneath it. The M11 line has "U" logo next to its own entrances. Entrances are usually built into sidewalks along a street, although many stations of newer lines have their entrances from street level on small plazas.

Out of the 133 operating stations of the Istanbul Metro:

 117 are fully underground 
 7 are elevated stations
 7 are on an embankment or at-grade
 2 are partially underground

Mezzanines

Most stations have a mezzanine directly below street level, which allows passengers to enter the stations from multiple locations and proceed to the correct platform without having to cross any streets. Inside the mezzanines are ticket machines and turnstiles, where passengers must pay to enter fare control zones and proceed to the trains.

In some stations, mezzanines connect directly to nearby buildings and structures, such as shopping malls or business centres. Each station concourse or mezzanine are patrolled by Istanbul Metro security guards to prevent fare evasion and crime.

Stations with large walkways toward different exits, such as Taksim, also have travelators to cover the long walking distances.

Upon entering the station, passengers may use ticket vending machines or staffed ticket booths to purchase their fare, which can be stored on the Istanbulkart contactless smart card. After entering the fare-controlled area, via the turnstiles, passengers may continue further down to the platform level.

Platforms

Since the different lines of the Istanbul Metro have different specifications, most notably car length, there is no uniform length for platforms. Platforms on the M5 line can accommodate up to 6-car trains, whiles platforms on the M6, M8, and M9 lines are accommodate 4-car trains.

Sections of platforms are subject to close during off-peak hours, especially on the M2 line. While platforms on the M2 line are open fully during peak hours, capacity is reduced to 4-car trains during off-peak hours. Platforms on the M5, M7, M8 and M11 lines are protected by platform edge doors. Except on funicular lines, most platforms of the Istanbul Metro consist of two side platforms or one island platform. Five stations consist of two island platforms, serving three tracks in a configuration known as the Spanish Solution. These stations are Otogar on the M1 line, Yenikapı and Sanayi on the M2 line, Olimpiyat on the M9 line, and Bostancı on the M4 line.

Technical specifications

This table lists technical characteristics of the metro lines that are currently in service or under construction.

Alignment and interchanges

Apart from the Haliç station on the M2 line, about half of the M1 (mostly M1A) line, Alibeyköy and Kağıthane valleys crossing by the M7 line and viaduct section at Olimpiyat of the M9 line, the lines are fully underground. All station names are on the bus lines as well.

The M2 line has an interchange between F1 in Taksim and an interchange tunnel with the Zincirlikuyu Metrobus station at the Gayrettepe station. There is also a transfer station at Yenikapı with Marmaray, M1 line and İDO Ferry Port; from where it is possible to take the high-speed catamaran Seabus departing for Bursa, Bandırma or Yalova; as well as the other Seabus ports of İstanbul such as Bostancı, Kadıköy, Bakırköy and Kabataş.

The M3 line has an interchange with the M1B line at the Kirazlı station.

The M4 line has a vapur (traditional ferry), motorboat, İDO and nostalgic tram interchange at Kadıköy which is the heart of İstanbul's Asian side. One can also interchange to Marmaray at the Ayrılık Ceşmesi station. Also at Ünalan / Uzunçayır, the line has a Metrobus interchange just like Gayrettepe in M2.

The M5 line has an interchange with the Marmaray and İDO at the Üsküdar station. Also at Altunizade the line has a Metrobus interchange.

The M6 line has an interchange with the M2 line at the Levent station.

The M7 line interchanges with the M2 line at the Mecidiyeköy station, with the T4 tramway line at the Kiptaş-Venezia/Karadeniz station, and with the M3 at the Mahmutbey station.

The M8 line has an interchange with the Marmaray at the Bostancı station, with the M4 line at the Kozyatağı station and with the M5 line at the Dudullu station.

The M9 has an interchange with the M3 at Ikitelli station.

Rolling stock

Although line M1 is a (light) metro line, its rolling stock—in use since 1989—is made up of typical ABB light rail vehicles (LRVs). These are partly the same as those used on the T4 tramway line.

The first Istanbul full metro rolling stocks, which entered service on 16 September 2000, on the Taksim - 4. Levent line, were built by Alstom. These trains are air-conditioned and equipped with LCD screens, and share a similar exterior design to the first three generations of rolling stock used on the Caracas Metro in Venezuela.

On 30 January 2009, the first 8 trains (each with 4 wagons) built by Eurotem (the Turkish factory of Hyundai Rotem) entered service. Today the system has 268 trains. These trains are also air conditioned and equipped with LCD screens, as well as dynamic route map showing the location and direction of the train.

In September 2009, CAF signed a contract to supply 144 units for the M4 metro line, amounting to 1.1 million euros. These metro units are formed with 4 cars for a total length of 90 meters and have a maximum transport capacity of 1300 passengers.

In August 2013, tender for the 126 driverless train units for the M5 line was won by CAF and Mitsubishi with 119 million euros. The first units were delivered in November 2016.

In March 2016, Eurotem signed a contract to supply 300 driverless units for the M7 line, amounting to 280.200.000 euros.

Future extensions
Since the city does not have a widespread railway network, the Metropolitan Municipality aims to connect urban areas of the city that do not have access to the Istanbul two coastal railways with metro lines.

None of the current Istanbul Metro lines cross the Bosphorus; lines are wholly located either on the European side or the Asian side of the city. In 2019, The Ministry of Transport and Infrastructure began the planning of a  line that would link İncirli with Söğütlüçeşme via a tunnel under the Bosphorus also designed to accommodate road traffic.

The following metro lines are under construction:

{| class="wikitable"
|- 
! Line
! Route
! Length
! Stations
! Notes
|-
|
|Kirazlı ↔ Halkalı
|9.70 km (under construction)
|9 (under construction)
|Under construction, partially (Kirazlı-Halkalı Üniversite) opening: 2024.
|- 
| rowspan="2" | 
| Bakırköy-İDO ↔ Kirazlı
| 9.0 km (under construction)
| 7 (under construction)
| Under construction, opening: 2023.
|-
|MetroKent ↔ Kayaşehir Merkez
|6.20 km (under construction)
|4 (under construction)
|Under construction, opening: 2023.
|- 
|
|Tavşantepe ↔ Tuzla
|7.90 km (under construction)
|6 (under construction)
|Under construction, partially (Tavşantepe-Kaynarca Merkez) opening: 2025.
|-
|
|Çekmeköy–Sancaktepe ↔ Sultanbeyli
|10.90 km (under construction)
|8 (under construction)
|Under construction, partially (Çekmeköy-Sancaktepe City Hospital) opening: 2023.
|-
| rowspan="2" | 
| Kabataş ↔ Yıldız
| 4.5 km (under construction)
| 2 (under construction)
| Under construction, opening: 2024
|-
|Mahmutbey ↔ Esenyurt Meydan
|18.50 km (under construction)
|11 (under construction)
|Under construction, partially (Mahmutbey-Hastane) opening: 2025.
|- 
|
| Ataköy ↔ Bahariye
| 10.8 km (under construction)
| 9 (under construction)
|Under construction, opening: 2024.
|-
|
|Pendik Merkez ↔ Fevzi Çakmak
|5.10 km (under construction)
|2 (under construction)
|Under construction, opening: 2025.|- 
| rowspan="2" |
| Gayrettepe ↔ Kağıthane
| 3.2 km (under construction)
| 1 (under construction)
|Under construction, opening: 2023.|-
|Halkalı ↔ Istanbul Airport
|31.50 km (under construction)
|7 (under construction)
|Under construction, opening: 2023.|-
|
|60. Yıl Parkı ↔ Kazım Karabekir
|13.03 km (under construction)
|11 (under construction)
|Under construction, opening: 2024.|- 
| 
| Altunizade ↔ Kazım Karabekir
| 7.3 km (under construction)
| 6 (under construction)
| Under construction, opening: 2024|- 
| colspan="2" style="text-align:right;" | TOTAL: 
| 137,9 km 
| 84 
|
|}

Construction of the following metro lines are planned or on hold:

European side

 M3 metro line extensions 
 Bakırköy–Kirazlı metro line. The 9 km extension project will integrate the line with Marmaray in its Özgürlük Meydanı Station, and İDO ferry station with Bakırköy İDO station.''
 Another extension will run north from Metrokent station to the Kayaşehir public housing development where it will intersect with the future Istanbul Airport metro line.

M7 metro line extension
The M7 Kabataş-Yıldız metro line extension is under construction. The extension will have 2 new stations and is expected to go into service in 2024. It will interconnect with ferries at Beşiktaş and Kabataş stations, and with T1 trams line at Kabataş station.

M9 Metro Line extension
The M9 Ataköy-Bahariye metro extension is under construction. It is due to open in 2023 and will introduce 9 new stations to the line. It will interconnect with the future M7 Esenyurt-Mahmutbey line at Atatürk station, with the future M1B line at Mimar Sinan station, with the M1A and the Bus rapid transit at Yenibosna station and with Marmaray and the IDO ferries at Ataköy station.

M11 Metro Line
The M11 Kağıthane-Kargo Terminali metro extensions to Gayrettepe and Halkalı are under construction. The extension to Gayrettepe will be opened in April 2023 and to Halkalı will be opened on late-2023.

Asian side

M4 metro line
M4 Kadıköy–İçmeler Metro Line is extending to İçmeler. Planned opening date is 2025.
 Kaynarca Merkez (M10 Line Interchange)
 Çamçeşme
 Kavakpınar
 Esenyalı
 Aydıntepe
 İçmeler (Marmaray Interchange)

M5 metro line
M5 Üsküdar–Çekmeköy-Sultanbeyli Metro Line was being extended a tender signed in April 2017 but construction was restarted in November 2019. Planned opening date; 2023-2024
 Meclis
 Sarıgazi (M13 Line Interchange)
 Sancaktepe Şehir Hastanesi
 Sancaktepe
 Samandıra Merkez
 Veysel Karani
 Hasanpaşa
 Sultanbeyli

M12 60. Yıl Parkı-Kazım Karabekir Metro Line

This line will connect the underserved Ataşehir district with the regional centres of densely populated Ümraniye and integrate those districts into the İstanbul rapid rail system. Planned opening date is 2024.

 60. Yıl Parkı
 Tütüncü Mehmet Efendi (Marmaray Interchange)
 Sahrayıcedit
 Yenisahra (M4 Line Interchange)
 Ataşehir
 Finans Merkezi
 Site
 Atakent
 Çarşı (M5 Line Interchange)
 SBÜ Hastanesi
 Kazım Karabekir

M14 Altunuzade-Kazım Karabekir Metro Line

This line will serve the Çamlıca Hill, Çamlıca Mosque and Bosna Boulevard and will be connect the M5 and M12 metro lines. Planned opening date is 2024.

 Altunizade (M5 Interchange)
 Ferah Mahallesi
 Çamlıca Camii
 Bosna Bulvarı
 Yavuztürk Mahallesi
 Kazım Karabekir (M12 Interchange)

Network overview
Subway, commuter line (Marmaray), light-rail, cable car, ropeway and Metrobus (as of May 2021):

 In operation: 311.7 km / 284 stations
 Under construction: 113.9 km / 70 stations
 Planned: 100.3 km / 53 stations
 Sum: 523.7 km / 407 stations

Network map

See also
 Public transport in Istanbul
 Istanbul nostalgic tramways
 Sabiha Gökçen Airport
 Metrobus (Istanbul)
 Ferries in Istanbul
 Istanbul Airport
 Istanbul Tram
 Metro İstanbul

References

External links

 Metro İstanbul – official website of Metro operator 
 Istanbul Metro System Map
 Istanbul Metro Map on Google Maps with Geolocation 
 Istanbul Metro Map 
 Istanbul Metro Guide

 
Standard gauge railways in Turkey
Buildings and structures under construction in Turkey